Hileithia magualis is a moth in the family Crambidae. It was described by Achille Guenée in 1854. It is found in the Dominican Republic, Jamaica, Cuba, and the southern United States, where it has been recorded from Alabama, Arizona, Florida, Mississippi, Missouri, New Mexico, Oklahoma and Texas.

The wingspan is about 15 mm. Adults are on wing from March to December.

References

Moths described in 1854
Spilomelinae